Noel Arthur David  (born 26 February 1971) is a former Indian cricketer.  He played domestic cricket for Hyderabad and played four One Day Internationals for India in 1997.

Early life 
When he was 5 years old his family moved to Hyderabad from Puducherry.  Still, one of his siblings (elder brother) is living in Puducherry. He attended All Saints High School which has produced test players like Abid Ali, Syed Kirmani, Mohammad Azharuddin and Venkatapathy Raju. Already a 100 and 200 m athlete, his fielding developed with coach Sampath Kumar.

Career 
David was a bowling all-rounder - a decent off-break bowler and a lower order batsman. He was an excellent fielder. David scored a double century in just his second game as part of Hyderabad's record 944.

Sachin Tendulkar is believed to have asked "Noel who?" when he learned that Noel David was the replacement for the injured Javagal Srinath during India's 1997 tour of West Indies. Noel David in a later interview clarified Sachin never said that statement, and it was Ajit Wadekar who did.

On the other hand, former BCCI secretary Jaywant Lele confirmed there was something fishy about the selection of the unheard-of Noel David from Hyderabad as a replacement for injured speedster Javagal Srinath on the tour.

Sunil Gavaskar once said that he was the greatest ever fielder for Indian cricket team; along with Caribbean commentator Tony Cozier, Gavaskar compared David with Jonty Rhodes.

Post retirement 
, David is chief selector for Hyderabad as well as chairman of the Junior Selection Committee. David has an ambition to become the coach of the Hyderabad team.

References

External links 

Hyderabad cricketers
Indian cricketers
India One Day International cricketers
South Zone cricketers
1971 births
Living people
Cricketers from Hyderabad, India
Alumni of All Saints High School, Hyderabad